Prizes of Ukraine in Literature is a material or honorary encouragement of writer or authors in Ukraine for achievements in various genres of literature.

 Shevchenko National Prize
 Maksym Rylsky Prize
 Pavlo Tychyna Prize
 Republican Prize in a field of literary-fiction critic
 Lesya Ukrainka Prize
 Nikolai Ostrovsky Prize of the Lenin's Komsomol of Ukraine
 Yaroslav Hadan Republican Prize in a field of journalism
 Andriy Holovko Prize
 Yuriy Yanovsky Prize
 Ivan Franko Prize
 Pavlo Usenko Prize of the Molod Publishing
 Oleksandr Kopylenko Prize of the Barvinok magazine
 Vasyl Stus Prize
 Kobzar Literary Award

See also

 List of literary awards
 List of poetry awards
 Warrior of Light

Further reading
 Writers - laureates of prizes of the USSR and the Union's republics. Lviv 1980
 Babych, Ye., Rohova, P. Writers of the Soviet Ukraine - laureates (1941-1979). Bibliographic index. Kiev 1979

External links
 Prizes of Ukraine in Literature. Ukrainian Soviet Encyclopedia

Civil awards and decorations of the Soviet Union

Ukrainian culture